Bombalurina may refer to:

 Bombalurina (cat), character in the musical Cats
 Bombalurina, a band fronted by Timmy Mallett